Guy De Saint Cyr (born 15 April 1958, in Berlin, Germany) is a German actor.

He starred in the 1989 James Bond film Licence to Kill as a henchman named Braun of the drug baron Franz Sanchez, played by Robert Davi.

Filmography

References

1958 births
Living people
German people of French descent
German male film actors